Christi Krybbe skoler is an elementary school in Bergen, Norway. It is the oldest existing school of elementary education in Scandinavia, having been founded 1737 under the name Korskirken's School for the Poor. The school got its own building in 1740, and the name was changed to Christi Krybbe fundasskole. Later, in 1874, the school was expanded when a second building, named Øvregaten skole, was built next to the old one. Starting 1874, both buildings were called Øvregaten skole, a name which lasted until the entire school was renamed Christi Krybbe skoler in 1970.

References

Further reading
 
 

Schools in Bergen
Primary schools in Norway
1737 establishments in Norway
Educational institutions established in 1737